Jig-a-Jig may refer to:

 Jig-a-Jig (song), a song by East of Eden
 Jig-a-Jig (EP), an EP by Skyclad